Terminator 2: Judgment Day is a 1991 pinball machine designed by Steve Ritchie and released by Williams Electronics. It is based on the motion picture of the same name.

Overview

The table is the first Williams WPC machine designed to feature a dot-matrix display. But due to the long design phase, Gilligan's Island is the first manufactured with a DMD. Terminator 2: Judgment Day is the first game to feature an autoplunger (replacing the traditional plunger), as well as a ball-firing cannon (dubbed, "Gun Grip Ball Launcher"). Finally, T2 is the first game to feature a video mode, a mini video game featured on the DMD. Arnold Schwarzenegger provided voices for the game. Some playfield design elements were based on Ritchie's 1980 classic, Firepower. The T-1000 is not in the artwork, with the exception of a small image of actor Robert Patrick because of pre-release secrecy of the movie. The character is only in the display animation because when the DMD programming was finalizing the liquid metal character was already public knowledge.

A score award is given for each extra ball awarded after hitting the max extra balls.

Interestingly, the major features of this game are the same as the 4th and final table in the classic 1992 Commodore Amiga game Pinball Dreams, called Nightmare, or Graveyard on other platforms. These include the left and right runs which allow you to advance up the central ladder to activate huge scoring opportunities.

Reception
Sinclair User gave the pinball game a 91% score.

Legacy
2003's Terminator 3: Rise of the Machines from Stern has a very similar playfield design and rulesheet.

Terminator 2: Judgment Day was formerly available as a licensed table of The Pinball Arcade for any platform until June 30, 2018 due to the WMS license's expiration and made this table disappear from every digital store.

References

External links
IPDB listing for Terminator 2: Judgment Day
Terminator 2: Judgment Day promo video (part 1)
Terminator 2: Judgment Day promo video (part 2)

1991 pinball machines
Williams pinball machines
Pinball machines based on films
Terminator (franchise) video games